Annabelle Nicole Morozov (born 2 May 2001) is a Russian ice dancer. With her former skating partner, Andrei Bagin, she is the 2019 CS Golden Spin of Zagreb silver medalist.

Personal life 
Annabelle Morozov was born on 2 May 2001 in the United States to former competitive ice dancers Nikolai Morozov of Russia and Caroline Douarin of France. She lived in the U.S. and France throughout her childhood and holds American, French, and Russian citizenship. Morozov is fluent in English, French, and Russian. Her godparents are famed figure skating coach and commentator Tatiana Tarasova and 2002 Olympic champion Alexei Yagudin.

Career

Early career 
Morozov first began skating in 2006 and competed in ladies' singles for both the United States and France. She is the 2014 U.S. juvenile national silver medalist. During the 2015–16 season, Morozov competed at both domestic American and French competitions while representing France internationally at the 2016 Mentor Toruń Cup.

Morozov switched to competing for Russia in ice dance in 2016. She and her father and coach, Nikolai, made the decision while considering the depth of the Russian ladies field. While searching for a partner, Morozov worked with various ice dance coaches apart from her father, including Marina Zoueva, Igor Shpilband, and Alexander Zhulin.

2017–2018 season 
Morozov tried out with Andrei Bagin during her time at Alexander Zhulin's rink in August 2017, due to coincidental timing and without any prior planning. After receiving the approval of her coach, Morozov and Bagin began training under her father's tutelage. Morozov/Bagin debuted at the Russian national test skates in September, just one month after teaming up. The team qualified for the 2018 Russian Championships in their first season together and placed eighth. Their coach expressed satisfaction with their accomplishments in their debut season.

2018–2019 season 
Morozov/Bagin made their international and Grand Prix debut after being selected as the host pick for the 2018 Rostelecom Cup, where they finished ninth. They later competed on the 2018–19 ISU Challenger Series, finishing seventh at 2018 CS Tallinn Trophy and eighth at 2018 CS Golden Spin of Zagreb. Morozov/Bagin again finished eighth at the 2019 Russian Championships to end their season.

2019–2020 season 
Morozov/Bagin spent time working with Pasquale Camerlengo and Igor Shpilband in Detroit, Michigan and Ivan Volobuiev in Moscow throughout the season while retaining Morozov's father as their main coach. They opened their season at 2019 CS Ice Star, where they finished third in the rhythm dance and fourth in the free dance, to finish fourth overall. At their next event, 2019 CS Golden Spin of Zagreb, Morozov/Bagin finished second in both segments to win their first international medal, silver, behind Italy's Guignard/Fabbri and ahead of Green/Parsons of the United States. The team set personal bests in all three segments and surpassed their previous best total score by over 13 points.

Morozov/Bagin finished fourth at the 2020 Russian Championships, their highest placement at the event. As a result, they were selected as first alternates for the 2020 World Championships.

2020–2021 season 
Morozov/Bagin started the season at the senior Russian test skates. Competing on the domestic Cup of Russia series, they won silver in the first stage in Syzran and gold in the second stage in Moscow.  They competed on the Grand Prix at the 2020 Rostelecom Cup, where they placed fourth in the rhythm dance. They dropped to fifth place after the free dance.

With defending national champions Sinitsina/Katsalapov sitting out the 2021 Russian Championships due to COVID-19 infection, the bronze medal position on the podium was widely perceived as a close contest among several teams, Morozov/Bagin among them.  However, they performed poorly in the rhythm dance, with Bagin first stumbling in the Finnstep pattern dance segment, and then both falling in the step sequence.  As a result, they placed seventh in the rhythm dance, 15.66 points behind fifth-place Shevchenko/Eremenko and 18.02 points behind Skoptcova/Aleshin in third.  They placed third in the free dance, partly due to errors from teams ahead, but due to the wide deficit from the rhythm dance, they rose only to sixth place overall.  Morozov said afterward that while it had been difficult to perform after such a difficult first day, "I just tried to forget about yesterday, and we are very pleased with how we performed today."

Following the national championships, Morozov/Bagin participated in the 2021 Channel One Trophy, a televised team competition held in lieu of the cancelled European Championships.  They were selected for the Red Machine team captained by Alina Zagitova.  They placed fourth in both their segments of the competition, while their team finished first overall.

2021–2022 season 
Morozov and Bagin had previously been contemplating a free dance based on Nikolai Rimsky-Korsakov's Scheherazade, but had put away the idea after the onset of the pandemic. They revived the concept for the 2021–22 season, Morozov noting that they hoped "the way we portray the characters and even costume-wise and movements" were "a little bit different" from the famous free dance of Americans Davis/Charlie White. They made their season debut at the 2021 Skate America, where they placed fifth. They went on to finish sixth at the 2021 Internationaux de France.

At the 2022 Russian Championships, Morozov/Bagin finished fourth, 0.10 points behind bronze medalists Khudaiberdieva/Bazin.

Programs

With Bagin

Competitive highlights 
GP: Grand Prix; CS: Challenger Series

With Naryzhnyy for Russia

With Bagin for Russia

Ladies' singles for France

Ladies' singles for the United States

Detailed results 
Small medals for short and free programs awarded only at ISU Championships. At team events, medals awarded for team results only. ISU personal bests highlighted in bold.

With Bagin

References

External links 

 
 

2001 births
Living people
Russian female ice dancers